Pontomyia is a genus of flightless marine midges belonging to the subfamily Chironominae in the Chironomidae family. Insects in marine environments are extremely rare while flightlessness, extreme sexual dimorphism, and an extremely short adult life span (of less than 3 hours) contribute to making these midges unusual among insects. They are known from the shores of islands in the Indian, Atlantic and Pacific Oceans.

The genus was described by Edwards in 1926 from Samoa. They were originally described as being submarine midges. Four species were described in the genus P. natans (Edward 1924), P. cottoni (Wormersley 1937), P. pacifica (Tokunaga 1964), and P. oceana (Tokunaga 1964) but DNA analysis determined that cottoni was not distinguishable from natans. Larvae from Puerto Rico were found to be close enough to P. natans based on DNA sequences. This suggests that species in the genus are capable of being dispersed widely across oceans. Algae attached to sea turtles have been found carrying Pontomyia larvae and this form of hitch-hiking can potentially serve as means of dispersion.

P. natans is widely distributed around the Indian and Pacific Oceans and its life history is slightly better known than other species. The adults live less than three hours long with males dying shortly after mating and females after laying eggs. Males have long antennae with the mid legs short and tipped in claws. The stubby wings are used like oars to swim at the surface of sea-water. The females are larviform, without wings or functional legs. The eggs are laid in coils in rockpools where they sink to the bottom. The larvae feed on algae and marine vegetation. Adult emergence is linked to lunar cycles, mainly at low tide, and midges are attracted to lights.

References

External links 
 Taxonomic notes

Chironomidae
Marine insects
Wingless Diptera